Bell Tower Hotel is a 4-star hotel in Xian, China. It located right in the heart of the city, opposite the well known Bell Tower and the newly built Bell & Drum Tower Square. One can find many historical sites within walking distance from the hotel.

History
Bell Tower, originally built in the 17th year of Hongwu reign in the Ming dynasty with more than 600 years’ history, stands in the center of Ancient Xi’an City. The flying crane and twisting dragon are engraved on the surface of the bell and the bell's sound can reach more than 10 miles, which not only reflects hundreds of years' history but also deserves to be the symbol of Xi'an. According to the old legend, the hotel named Bell Tower Hotel.

Rewards

The Bell Tower Hotel is prized as  the “Golden Key Service Diamond Award” and honor title of the “Sincere Service Team Cooperation Award” granted by the Golden Key Hotels of the World.

Footnotes

See also
 Terracotta Army
 Xi'an Incident

External links
UNESCO description of the Mausoleum of the First Qin Emperor
People's Daily article on the Terracotta Army
 Hotels in XiAn

Hotels in Xi'an